The hares are a genus of mammals in the Leporidae family. Some other members of the family are also known as hares, including:
Hispid hare, Caprolagus hispidus
Red rock hares, genus Pronolagus
Belgian hare, a breed of domestic rabbit

Hare may also refer to:

People:
Hare (surname), including a list of people with the name
Hare Indians or Slavey, a Canadian First Nations aboriginal people
Hare Te Rangi (born 1977), New Zealand former rugby league footballer

Places:
Hare Bay (Newfoundland), Canada
Hares Canyon, Oregon
Hare Island, next to the port of Thoothukudi, Tamil Nadu, India
Hare or Zayachy Island, St. Petersburg, Russia
Hare, a hamlet in the parish of Broadway, Somerset
Hare nome or simply "the Hare", a nome in ancient Egypt
Hare, Texas, unincorporated community in Williamson County

Other uses:

Hare baronets, three baronetcies, one of England and two of the United Kingdom
Handley Page Hare, a British bomber aircraft retired in 1937
Hare (hieroglyph)
Hare (computer virus), which infected MS-DOS and Windows 95 machines in August 1996
Hare Psychopathy Checklist, a contemporary psycho-diagnostic tool commonly used to assess psychopathy
Hare School, one of the oldest schools (grades 1-12) in Kolkata, India
Hare Field, a sports facility in Hillsboro, Oregon
Hare language, a dialect of the Slavey language spoken in Canada

See also  
Hair (disambiguation) 
Hare & Hare, a former landscape architecture firm in Kansas City, Missouri 
Hare Krishna (mantra) 
Hare Krishna movement, colloquial term for the International Society for Krishna Consciousness
Hare quota, a system of voting attributed to Thomas Hare 
O'Hare (disambiguation)
Sea hare, a small marine gastropod mollusc